Bölkow was a West German aircraft manufacturer based in Stuttgart, Germany, and later Ottobrunn.

History
The company was founded in 1948 by Ludwig Bölkow, who since 1955 with Emil Weiland had developed helicopters for Bölkow Entwicklungen KG.

In June 1968, Bölkow merged with the Messerschmitt AG to form Messerschmitt-Bölkow, a combination that created West Germany's largest aircraft company, with sales approaching $150 million (1968 dollars). The move was encouraged by the West German government. In May 1969, the new company merged with Hamburger Flugzeugbau (HFB), becoming Messerschmitt-Bölkow-Blohm (MBB). MBB was bought by Daimler-Benz in the early 1990s, becoming part of DASA, which became part of EADS in 2000.

Products

Aircraft

 Bölkow Bo 207
 Bölkow Bo 208 Junior
 Bölkow Bo 209 Monsun
 Bölkow Phoebus, variants A, A1, B, B1, B3, C gliders

Helicopter
 Bölkow Bo 46
 Bölkow Heidelbergrotor experimental rotor system
 Bölkow Bo 70 Project with experimental "Heidelberg Rotor"
 Bölkow Bo 102
 Bölkow Bo 103
 MBB Bo 105
 MBB/Kawasaki BK 117 Joint project with Kawasaki

Missiles
 Cobra
 HOT
 MILAN
 Roland

References

 

Manufacturing companies based in Stuttgart
Defunct aircraft manufacturers of Germany
Defunct helicopter manufacturers of Germany
Companies based in Bavaria
 
German companies established in 1948